Sonora Stagecoach is a 1944 American black-and-white Western film starring Bob Steele, Hoot Gibson and Chief Thundercloud. Directed, produced and written by Robert Emett Tansey for Monogram Pictures, the film was released in the United States on June 10, 1944.

Plot
The Trail Blazers cowboys (Hoot Gibson, Bob Steele, and Chief Thundercloud) are escorting a prisoner accused of bank robbery back to justice in order to stand trial. Along the way, The Trail Blazers become convinced that the prisoner may innocent, and several attempts are made on his life during the ride. A trap is then set for the real thieves.

Cast
 Hoot Gibson as Hoot Gibson
 Bob Steele as Bob Steele
 Chief Thundercloud as Chief Thunder Cloud
 Gene Alsace as Rocky Camron (as Rocky Camron)
 Betty Miles as Betty Miles
 Glenn Strange as Paul Kenton
 George Eldredge as Lawyer Larry Payne (as Geo. Eldridge)
 Karl Hackett as Banker Joe Kenton
 Henry Hall as Sonora Sheriff Hampton
 Charles King as Henchman Blackie Reed (as Chas. King)
 Bud Osborne as Henchman Steve Martin (as Bud Osborn)
 Charles Murray Jr. as Henchman Weasel (as Chas. Murray Jr.)
 John Bridges as Pop Carson
 Forrest Taylor as Judge Crandall
 Al Ferguson as Henchman Red

See also
 Bob Steele filmography
 Hoot Gibson filmography

External links
 

1944 films
American black-and-white films
American Western (genre) films
1944 Western (genre) films
Monogram Pictures films
1940s English-language films
1940s American films